Nupserha pallidipennis is a species of beetle in the family Cerambycidae. It was described by Redtenbacher in 1858, originally under the genus Phytoecia. It is known from Nepal, Bhutan, Myanmar, and India.

Subspecies
 Nupserha pallidipennis pallidipennis (Redtenbacher, 1858)
 Nupserha pallidipennis flavipennis Breuning, 1950

References

pallidipennis
Beetles described in 1858